is a district located in Kyoto Prefecture, Japan.

As of 2003, the district has an estimated population of 19,200 and a density of 251.74 persons per km2. The total area is 76.27 km2.

Towns and villages
Ide
Ujitawara

Districts in Kyoto Prefecture